Audrey Allen "Sousie" Moore (June 18, 1915 – July 28, 1991) was an American football defensive end in the National Football League. Moore came out of Texas A&M to join the Green Bay Packers in 1939, playing five games for the Packers, including the winning 1939 NFL championships. At Texas A&M, Moore played the sousaphone tuba, earning him the nickname "Sousie." Moore was drafted to the U.S. Navy in 1940 and stationed on the  USS Pennsylvania in San Diego, California, where he met Marie Darrieulat. They were married on January 28, 1940 before the Pennsylvania was deployed to the  Pacific theater of World War II. After the war, the Moores settled in the Los Angeles, California area and raised three daughters, Lynne, Suzanne and Kathleen.

References

1915 births
1991 deaths
Green Bay Packers players
Texas A&M Aggies football players